Liam Williams (born 8 February 1960) is an Irish rowing coxswain. He competed at the 1980 Summer Olympics and the 1988 Summer Olympics.

References

External links
 

1960 births
Living people
Irish male rowers
Olympic rowers of Ireland
Rowers at the 1980 Summer Olympics
Rowers at the 1988 Summer Olympics
Place of birth missing (living people)
Coxswains (rowing)